Shanhe may refer to these places in China:

Shanhe Subdistrict, a subdistrict of Shuangyang District, Changchun, Jilin
Shanhe Township, a township of Longde County, Ningxia

Towns
Shanhe, Gansu, in Zhengning County, Gansu
Shanhe, Heilongjiang, in Wuchang, Heilongjiang
Shanhe, Shanxi, in Zezhou County, Shanxi

See also
Sanhe (disambiguation)